Lynn Peterson was elected as the second woman to become mayor of the city of Thunder Bay, Ontario on November 10, 2003.

Prior to becoming mayor, Peterson served three years as a member of Thunder Bay City Council, and had nearly 20 years of community service. Before entering municipal politics, she served four terms on the Lakehead District School Board For three consecutive years she was elected chair of the board, and concluded her career in education governance by being elected president of the Ontario Public School Boards Association.

In 2006, due to Thunder Bay's struggling economy, Peterson traveled to Toronto, in order to secure Thunder Bay's Bombardier plant's bid to "Build Canadian and Buy Canadian".

Peterson was defeated by Keith Hobbs in the 2010 Ontario municipal elections.

Awards
 Citizen of Exceptional Achievement (City of Thunder Bay 2001)
 Bernadine Yackman Award (For outstanding service in education for the children of the North-2001)
 Giant Heart Award (City of Thunder Bay 1991)

References

See also
 List of mayors of Thunder Bay, Ontario
 2003 Ontario municipal elections

Mayors of Thunder Bay
Women mayors of places in Ontario
Year of birth missing (living people)
Living people